The following is a list of pipeline accidents in the United States in 1989. It is one of several lists of U.S. pipeline accidents. See also: list of natural gas and oil production accidents in the United States.

Incidents 

This is not a complete list of all pipeline accidents. For natural gas alone, the Pipeline and Hazardous Materials Safety Administration (PHMSA), a United States Department of Transportation agency, has collected data on more than 3,200 accidents deemed serious or significant since 1987.

A "significant incident" results in any of the following consequences:
 Fatality or injury requiring in-patient hospitalization.
 $50,000 or more in total costs, measured in 1984 dollars.
 Liquid releases of five or more barrels (42 US gal/barrel).
 Releases resulting in an unintentional fire or explosion.

PHMSA and the National Transportation Safety Board (NTSB) post-incident data and results of investigations into accidents involving pipelines that carry a variety of products, including natural gas, oil, diesel fuel, gasoline, kerosene, jet fuel, carbon dioxide, and other substances. Occasionally pipelines are re-purposed to carry different products.

The following incidents occurred during 1989:
 1989 On January 3, a road grader hit a 6 inch Colonial Pipeline stub line, in Fort Bragg, North Carolina, causing a gasoline spill. There was no fire or injuries.
 1989 On January 25, a 12-inch pipeline owned by Delhi Gas Pipeline exploded and burned near Lolita, Texas. 
 1989 On February 10, a natural gas explosion and fire in Oak Grove, Missouri, involved the failure of a customer owned service line at a threaded joint. Two persons were killed and their house was destroyed in the explosion.
1989 A leaking gas distribution line caused an explosion in Topeka, Kansas on March 25, killing one person. This was the latest in a string of gas distribution line failures that lead to an NTSB investigation into the regional gas company. 600,000 gas services lines were replaced as a result of the investigation.
 1989 A 34-inch Lakehead Pipeline ruptured on March 28, near Sanders, Minnesota, spilling 300 barrels of crude oil, of which 270 were recovered.
 1989 On March, 29 a road grader hit a gas pipeline, near Tuttle, Oklahoma. The grader driver was burned to death.
 1989 On April 10, a Dow Chemical Company NGL pipeline in Amber Township, Michigan was being purged, by passing a plastic pipeline pig propelled by compressed air. Iron sulfide residue inside the pipeline reacted, causing an explosion that burst 20 holes through the pipeline. There were no injuries.
 San Bernardino train disaster: On May 25, 1989, a Calnev Pipeline petroleum products pipeline failed, when cleanup performed after the train derailment caused damage to a petroleum products pipeline, spraying nearby homes with gasoline, which ignited shortly after the pipeline failure. Two people were killed, 31 were injured, 18 automobiles were destroyed, and 15 homes were damaged or destroyed in following fire. The pipeline Operator did not recognize there was a leak in the pipeline, and, restarted pumps for the pipeline 3 times, after automatic shut downs. A backflow prevention valve up hill of the failure also failed to close, intensifying the fire.
 1989 An Amoco 6 inch crude oil gathering pipeline ruptured, near Craig, Colorado on June 2, spilling  of crude into the Yampa River. Federal maintenance oversight of gathering pipelines ended in 1985.
 1989 On June 6, a road grader hit a Conoco LPG pipeline, in Laclede County, Texas. One person was killed.
 1989 A Mobil petroleum gathering pipeline spilled about 40 barrels of light oil into Lake Texana near Edna, Texas on June 27. The failure was caused by corrosion.
 1989 On July 13, an Enbridge pipeline failed in Pembina County, North Dakota, resulting in 31,300 barrels of crude oil being spilled, and about $2.4 million in damages & cleanup.
 1989 On July 24, excavation equipment hit a petroleum products pipeline in Kansas City, Kansas near I-70. About 693,000 gallons of product were spilled.
 1989 A bulldozer hit a petroleum products pipeline in a stream bed in Salem, Oregon on September 13. Gasoline entered a creek, killing fish, and forcing evacuations. About 23,000 to 30,000 gallons of gasoline were spilled.
Natural gas under 835 pounds per square inch pressure was released. An undetermined source on board the vessel ignited the gas, and within seconds, the entire vessel was engulfed in flames. The fire on the vessel burned until 4:30 a.m. on October 4, when it burned itself out. Leaking gas from the pipeline also continued to burn until the flow of gas subsided and the fire self-extinguished about 6 a.m. on October 4. Eleven of fourteen crew members died as a result of the accident.
 1989 An explosion at a valve in a natural gas processing station on October 25 near Evanston, Wyoming killed one worker, and injured 4 others.
 1989 On November 16, propane from a storage cavern for a pipeline escaped and ignited in Jasper, Missouri, forcing 1,000 people to evacuate. A rail line and a highway were also closed.
 1989 A farmer hit a propane pipeline near Butler, Illinois on December 8, forcing evacuation of that town. There was no fire.
 1989 On December 18, a Colonial Pipeline petroleum pipeline failed near Locust Grove, Virginia.  of kerosene spilled into the Rapidan and Rappahannock Rivers. On New Year's Eve, following a rapid thaw and heavy rains, containment dams broke and kerosene flowed downstream toward Fredericksburg, Virginia. Fish and game were killed, the City's water supply was cut off, and drinking water had to be hauled from Stafford County for seven days. The failure was caused by cracking caused during railroad shipping of the pipe before being installed. This was the seventh major leak from Colonial Pipeline in Virginia since 1973.
 1989 On December 29, shock waves from an explosion ruptured a 30-inch gas transmission pipeline operating at 350 psi in the Hell Gate section of New York City, New York. The rupture was 11 feet long, and escaping gas ignited, killing 2 people, injuring one other person, and destroying 2 buildings and 50 automobiles.
 1989 New York City Con Edison steam pipe explosion, rupture killing three people in the 3rd Ave./Gramercy Park area.

References

Lists of pipeline accidents in the United States